Ali Hassan is a Canadian comedian best known as the host of CBC Radio One's weekly comedy program Laugh Out Loud and as the moderator of CBC Radio's annual Canada Reads competition since 2017.

Born in Fredericton, New Brunswick, on September 11, 1972, and raised in Montreal, Quebec, Hassan studied business administration at McMaster University before launching his comedy career. Initially he ran his own catering business with the goal of becoming a television cooking show host, and began performing as a comedian to build his confidence. After two years performing as a comedian in Montreal, he was invited to perform as an opening act for Russell Peters at the inaugural Amman Stand-up Comedy Festival in Amman, Jordan. During this time, he also had supporting roles in the films Breakaway, French Immersion and Goon.

After moving to Toronto, Ontario in 2011, he began appearing regularly on George Stroumboulopoulos Tonight and continued performing as a touring comic. In 2013, he recorded his first comedy DVD, From Zero to Hero, in Montreal. In 2016, he performed his newest show, Muslim, Interrupted, at the Just for Laughs Festival.

In addition to his regular roles with CBC Radio, he is a frequent guest host of Q.

He received a Canadian Screen Award nomination for Best Host in a Web Program or Series at the 9th Canadian Screen Awards in 2021, as cohost with Peter Keleghan of the National Canadian Film Day livestream.

As of 2022, he has a recurring role in the CBC Television sitcom Run the Burbs.

References

External links

 

Canadian male comedians
Canadian stand-up comedians
Canadian male film actors
Canadian people of Pakistani descent
Canadian Muslims
CBC Radio hosts
People from Fredericton
Comedians from New Brunswick
Male actors from New Brunswick
Living people
McMaster University alumni
Comedians from Montreal
Male actors from Montreal
21st-century Canadian comedians
21st-century Canadian male actors
Year of birth missing (living people)